B. de Almeyda was a Dutch Jewish engraver who worked in Amsterdam in the 17th century.

References

Engravers from Amsterdam
Dutch Sephardi Jews
Year of birth missing
Year of death missing